The Walla Walla Sweets is an amateur baseball team located in Walla Walla, Washington.  They play in the West Coast League, a collegiate summer baseball league.  Walla Walla calls Borleske Stadium home which has a capacity of 2,378 spectators.

History

2010 season
The Sweets were an expansion team for the 2010 season. They set a WCL record for attendance in their first season, drawing 40,461 fans during 28 home games in 2010 (34,824 during league games), ranking #23 in the country in overall attendance. Four Sweets gained league recognition, with catcher Elliot Stewart (Cal Poly) being named to the second team All-WCL and pitcher Joey Wagman (Cal Poly), SS Kevin Kuntz (Kansas) and 1B/OF Dennis Holt (UCLA) being named to the honorable mention All-WCL team. GM Zachary Fraser was named the 2010 WCL Executive of the Year.

2011 season
After a last-place finish in the WCL East Division in 2010, the Sweets made significant changes to their roster, specifically bolstering the pitching rotation (a major concern after the inaugural campaign). Opening the season against Corvallis, the Sweets took 2-of-3 at home from the Knights, but the Sweets struggled for the next month. By July 15, the team was in third place in the East, trailing the Bellingham Bells by five games for the wild-card spot with only three weeks left in the regular season. The Sweets then became one of the hottest teams in the WCL, turned around their season and caught the Bells in the last week of the season to earn the WCL East wild-card spot with a 26-28 league record. With the WCL's second-best pitching staff and an improved offense, the Sweets shocked the league by sweeping Wenatchee (who were ranked #3 in the country and had won the regular season division title by 13 games over Walla Walla) two games to none in the division series, winning the WCL East Division as a wild card and earning a spot in the WCL Championship Series. The Sweets magic ran out, as the Knights swept the Sweets. However, the club saw major improvements over the first season. The team had the league MVP in 2011, 2B/SS Alex Stanford of Gonzaga, who also broke the league record for hits in a season (setting the new mark at 66). In addition to once again being a league leader in attendance (ranking #21 in the country, up from #23 and drawing over 54,000 fans), the team placed 6 players on the WCL East All-Star team (C Elliot Stewart, 2B/SS Alex Stanford, OF Andrew Mendenhall, and pitchers Ryan Richardson, Tim Culligan and Brett Watson), as well as the following recognitions for all-WCL performance: Alex Stanford (1st Team All-WCL), Andrew Mendenhall (2nd Team All-WCL), RHP Tim Culligan (2nd Team All-WCL), C Elliot Stewart (Honorable Mention All-WCL), RHP Ryan Richardson (Honorable Mention All-WCL), and LHP Brett Watson (Honorable Mention All-WCL). Richardson  led the league in ERA with a 1.53 mark in 53 IP.

Traditions started in 2011
The 2011 Sweets established a tradition that became a rallying call for the season. In the eighth inning, the club would play "Love is Gone"  by David Guetta over the sound system. 1,600 fans would get into a frenzy as the players would start to dance in rhythm to the song in the dugout. The team went on to win five games in which they were trailing after the 7th inning, the most in the WCL in 2011. Another tradition that became a fan favorite as the Sweets made their late-season push to the playoffs was the iconic call of broadcaster Tristan Hobbes calling with joy "The Sweets Win! How Sweet it is! ", while another favorite was his "Simon Says...Game Over!" call as closer Simon Anderson (North Dakota State) would finish off the game with a save.

2012 season
Despite high expectations heading into the season, in 2012 the Sweets didn't do as well as the year before. After an opening night sellout that saw streakers invade Borleske Stadium, the club struggled in the first few weeks of the season, and never climbed back out of the hole created. They finished last in their division, with a record of 24-30 they finished 8th overall. They did host the 2012 WCL All-Star Game with great success, and once again drew over 45,000 fans to Borleske Stadium. After the 2012 season, manager J.C. Biagi was promoted to Assistant GM, and general manager Zachary Fraser added the role of vice-president of Pacific Baseball Ventures to his title.

2013 season
2013 saw a Sweets club that stayed close to the top of the re-aligned North Division from start to finish, eventually clinching the club's first-ever WCL Division Pennant. The season got started with a bang, as the Sweets hosted a Walla Walla Police vs. Fire baseball battle to raise money for local charities. The Battle of the Badge raised $24,000 for local non-profits, and the success of that first night was a harbinger of what was to come. During the season, a tight pennant race ensued between Bellingham, Wenatchee and the Sweets, each taking turns at the top of the standings. The Sweets were led by an astounding nine All-Stars (6 pitchers, 3 position players) who represented Walla Walla in Victoria during the WCL All-Star Game: C Renae Martinez (UC-Irvine), OF Kramer Lindell (Linfield), 1B Matt Mendenhall (WSU), whose older brother Andrew had represented the Sweets in the ASG in 2011, and the following pitchers: Sean-Luke Brija (Gonzaga), Matt Hall (Missouri State), Sean Silva (USC), Chris Lovejoy (Ball State), Cody Poteet (UCLA), and Bret Helton (Utah). Helton was selected as the starter for the North in the All-Star Game, and Poteet was named the top prospect by the MLB Scouting Bureau. The Sweets made their run after the All-Star Game, going 11-5 to finish the season (winning a team-record eight in a row to close out the regular season), sweeping the Bend Elks in Bend to knock of the Wenatchee AppleSox (2012 pennant winners). The Sweets would face off against the AppleSox in the division series, a re-match of the 2011 playoffs. This time around, the Sox were the wildcard winners, and ultimately the victors, as Wenatchee advanced to the WCL Championship Series. The Sweets would finish the regular season 37-22 (31-22 in WCL league play), their best-ever record. Accolades on the season would include the 9 All-Stars, a ranking of #41 in the Perfect Game National Top 50 of Summer Collegiate teams, again ranking among the top 50 markets in the nation in attendance, and for the second consecutive year, counting a Sweet as the best MLB prospect in the game as named by Baseball America and Perfect Game (Poteet/UCLA). Closer Brija tied a WCL record for saves in a season (13) and joined teammates Hall and Silva as First-Team All-WCL performers.

2014 season
The Walla Walla Sweets went 28-26 in the 2014 season. They missed the playoffs by 2 games to the Yakima Valley Pippins. One of the most memorable nights in that season was a cool summer's night, the game was going in Kitsap's favor with a score of 2-1 in the top of the 4th inning, a runner on 2nd, Copper Hummel catching, and 2 outs, the pitch was delivered and the runner went. Hummel went to throw the ball but the backswing of the batter hit Hummel making him throw the ball all the way in to the mid-right outfield, the runner rounded 3rd and scored, the ruling should have been batter interference, the batter making the 3rd out and ending the inning but, the umpire never called batter interference, this in-turn caused a major uproar in the crowd and players. Head Coach J.C. Biagi went to go talk to the umpire but then retreated to the dugout but, before Biagi could get back Pitching Coach Mark Michaud yelled from the dugout "GET THE CALL RIGHT UMP'!" The argument with Michaud lasted about 5 minutes before Michaud was ejected and, left the field of play. Later in the game, Mikey Duarte was up to bat and turned to have the upcoming pitch hit his back instead of his side and he did get hit by the pitch. Now, in baseball if you get hit by the pitch you are awarded a walk to first base but, in some High School and Collegiate leagues, if the batter made no attempt to get out of the way of the pitch they are not awarded their base, the WCL is not one of these leagues. The umpire told Duarte to get back to the plate and finish his at-bat because he never got out of the pitch's way. Biagi got out of the dugout to complain to the umpire, except this Biagi got ejected and took 7 minutes to leave the field of play. One of the spectators claim from the crowd was "FORGET THE UMPIRES CODE AND MAKE THE RIGHT CALL!" The Umpires Code is a code between umpires where the other umpires will back up the umpire who made the call no matter how bad it was. Biagi and Michaud's appeal did not go their way and both were suspended for 4 games. After a five year run that included winning the Eastern division twice and one appearance in the WCL Championships, as well as impacting the community in so many ways through camps, business connections and leadership programs for children manager J.C. Biagi and pitching coach Mark Michaud stepped down. Biagi went to pursue other interests, while Michaud still lives in Walla Walla and is a full-time teacher in Milton Freewater where he also coaches boys basketball at McCloughlin High School. During the off-season, the Sweets hired Frank Mutz, former MLB pitcher, as the new head coach for 2015. The sweets averaged 1,188 fans a night drawing in 36,823 fans in 31 regular season games.

Season-by-season record

Division winning years
2011
2013

Media
Walla Walla Sweets games are broadcast live on KTEL 1490AM. In 2022, Gary Erdelyi became the radio play-by-play announcer and is the media relations liaison for the team.

The Sweets have a loyal following on Facebook and Twitter, and regularly post video shorts on their YouTube channel.

References

External links
 
 West Coast League

Amateur baseball teams in Washington (state)
Walla Walla, Washington